Petru Drăgoescu (first name also given as Petre; born 22 July 1962) is a Romanian former middle-distance runner who specialised in the 800 metres. He represented his country at the 1983 World Championships. In addition, he won the silver medal at the 1985 European Indoor Championships. As of December 2016, he is still the Romanian national record holder both indoors and outdoors.

International competitions

Personal bests
Outdoor
800 metres – 1:45.41 (Kobe 1985) NR
1500 metres – 3:40.38 (Athens 1984)
Indoor
800 metres – 1:47.21 (Pireaus 1985) NR
1500 metres – 3:41.02 (Budapest 1985)

References

All-Athletics profile

1962 births
Living people
Romanian male middle-distance runners